Symplocos nicolsonii is a species of evergreen tree in the family Symplocaceae. It is endemic to Western Ghats in India.

The species was named after the noted botanical taxonomist Dan H. Nicolson.

References

nicolsonii
Endemic flora of India (region)